An arithmetic progression or arithmetic sequence is a sequence of numbers such that the difference from any succeeding term to its preceding term remains constant throughout the sequence. The constant difference is called common difference of that arithmetic progression. For instance, the sequence 5, 7, 9, 11, 13, 15, . . . is an arithmetic progression with a common difference of 2.

A finite portion of an arithmetic progression is called a finite arithmetic progression and sometimes just called an arithmetic progression. The sum of a finite arithmetic progression is called an arithmetic series.

History 
According to an anecdote of uncertain reliability, young Carl Friedrich Gauss in primary school reinvented this method to compute the sum of the integers from 1 through 100, by multiplying  pairs of numbers in the sum by the values of each pair . However, regardless of the truth of this story, Gauss was not the first to discover this formula, and some find it likely that its origin goes back to the Pythagoreans in the 5th century BC. Similar rules were known in antiquity to Archimedes, Hypsicles and Diophantus; in China to Zhang Qiujian; in India to Aryabhata, Brahmagupta and Bhaskara II; and in medieval Europe to Alcuin, Dicuil, Fibonacci, Sacrobosco
and to anonymous commentators of Talmud known as Tosafists.

Sum

Computation of the sum 2 + 5 + 8 + 11 + 14. When the sequence is reversed and added to itself term by term, the resulting sequence has a single repeated value in it, equal to the sum of the first and last numbers (2 + 14 = 16). Thus 16 × 5 = 80 is twice the sum.
The sum of the members of a finite arithmetic progression is called an arithmetic series. For example, consider the sum:

This sum can be found quickly by taking the number n of terms being added (here 5), multiplying by the sum of the first and last number in the progression (here 2 + 14 = 16), and dividing by 2:

In the case above, this gives the equation:

For example: this

Derivation 

To derive the above formula, begin by expressing the arithmetic series in two different ways:

Rewriting the terms in reverse order:

Adding the corresponding terms of both sides of the two equations and halving both sides:

This formula can be simplified as:

Furthermore, the mean value of the series can be calculated via: :

The formula is very similar to the mean of a discrete uniform distribution.

Product
The product of the members of a finite arithmetic progression with an initial element a1, common differences d, and n elements in total is determined in a closed expression

where  denotes the Gamma function. The formula is not valid when  is negative or zero.

This is a generalization from the fact that the product of the progression  is given by the factorial  and that the product

Derivation

where  denotes the rising factorial.

By the recurrence formula , valid for a complex number ,

,

,

so that

for  a positive integer and  a positive complex number.

Thus, if ,

,

and, finally,

Examples

Example 1
Taking the example , the product of the terms of the arithmetic progression given by  up to the 50th term is

 Example 2
The product of the first 10 odd numbers  is given by
 =

Standard deviation

The standard deviation of any arithmetic progression can be calculated as

where  is the number of terms in the progression and
 is the common difference between terms. The formula is very similar to the standard deviation of a discrete uniform distribution.

Intersections
The intersection of any two doubly infinite arithmetic progressions is either empty or another arithmetic progression, which can be found using the Chinese remainder theorem. If each pair of progressions in a family of doubly infinite arithmetic progressions have a non-empty intersection, then there exists a number common to all of them; that is, infinite arithmetic progressions form a Helly family. However, the intersection of infinitely many infinite arithmetic progressions might be a single number rather than itself being an infinite progression.

See also
 Geometric progression
 Harmonic progression
 Triangular number
 Arithmetico-geometric sequence
 Inequality of arithmetic and geometric means
 Primes in arithmetic progression
 Linear difference equation
 Generalized arithmetic progression, a set of integers constructed as an arithmetic progression is, but allowing several possible differences
 Heronian triangles with sides in arithmetic progression
 Problems involving arithmetic progressions
 Utonality
 Polynomials calculating sums of powers of arithmetic progressions

References

External links
 
 
 

Arithmetic series
Articles containing proofs
Sequences and series